White Eagle Hall is a music, theatre, and dining venue in a restored historic building in the Village neighborhood of Downtown Jersey City, New Jersey, located on Newark Avenue. Originally built in 1910 as community center. It was used for events such as bingo games, dance recitals, and concerts, and later as a basketball practice hall. It has been restored as a performing arts, gallery space, and restaurant complex.

Construction and architecture
The white eagle is part of the coat of arms of Poland. White Eagle Hall, which opened in 1910 was built by Polish immigrants and craftsmen under the direction Rev. Peter Boleslaus Kwiatowski, who established numerous parishes in northeastern New Jersey. The facade of the building is adorned with busts of Polish heroes Ignacy Jan Paderewski, Casimir Pulaski, Tadeusz Kosciuszko, and Henryk Sienkiewicz. There are two glass skylights – one commemorating Frédéric Chopin, the classical music composer, and the other Marcella Sembrich, an internationally renowned opera star.

Saint Anthony's
In 1934, ownership was transferred to St. Anthony of Padua Roman Catholic Church and served, among purposes as a bingo hall. For many years was the practice gym of the national powerhouse St. Anthony High School basketball team, the Friars. They did not play any home games there (they often played at the Jersey City Armory). Coach Bob Hurley led this team to 28 state championships, 4 national championships and was inducted into the Basketball Hall of Fame.

Entertainment venue
From 1968 to 1975 "Battle of the Bands" contests took place on the stage, where talents such as Rock and Roll Hall of Famer Frank Infante, the guitarist for Blondie, got their start.

Beginning in 2013,  the building underwent a comprehensive multimillion-dollar historic restoration by the Ben LoPiccolo Development Group. The original wood floor was used as bar counters and balcony flooring; wood fixtures from nearby Saint Boniface Church (from 1865) were used in the window frames, bar sides and balcony railings and ledges; Boniface altar fixtures are part the box office and merchandise area. The venue reopened in April 2017 with performances by the  Jersey City Theater Center (JCTC). On May 5 a ribbon cutting and opening ceremony (with Mayor Steven Fulop) and first official concert( with Sunshine & The Rain and Rye Coalition).

The venue has a capacity of 800 standing or 400 seated, and can be configured for other events. It features three separate bars, 28 foot-high ceilings; a 25-foot high proscenium stage (30 feet wide and 25 feet deep) with two levels of back-stage areas, including fully equipped dressing rooms and warm up areas. The building also houses restaurants. It is seen as an important new venue in the Hudson County music scene.

White Eagle Hall is a venue for the Golden Door Film Festival.

See also
Order of the White Eagle (Poland)

References

External links 
 White Eagle Hall
 Jersey City Theatre Center
 

Buildings and structures in Jersey City, New Jersey
Culture of Jersey City, New Jersey
Music venues in New Jersey
1910 establishments in New Jersey
Nightclubs in the United States
Tourist attractions in Jersey City, New Jersey
Polish-American culture in New Jersey